Coraline Hugue (born 11 March 1984), also known as Coraline Thomas Hugue, is a French former cross-country skier.  She competed for France at the 2014 Winter Olympics in Sochi, in skiathlon and women's classical. She also competed for France at the 2018 Winter Olympics in Pyeongchang.

Cross-country skiing results
All results are sourced from the International Ski Federation (FIS).

Olympic Games

World Championships

World Cup

Season standings

References

External links
  (}
 
 
 
 

1984 births
Living people
French female cross-country skiers
Olympic cross-country skiers of France
Cross-country skiers at the 2014 Winter Olympics
Cross-country skiers at the 2018 Winter Olympics
Tour de Ski skiers
People from Embrun, Hautes-Alpes
Sportspeople from Hautes-Alpes
21st-century French women